The Welsh Wikipedia is the Welsh-language edition of Wikipedia. This edition was started in July 2003. On 23 June 2007, it reached 10,000 articles, the 66th Wikipedia to do so. On 20 November 2008, it attained 20,000 articles. Less than a year later, on 28 October 2009, it reached 25,000 articles. In July 2013 it reached 50,000 articles and is now the  largest Wikipedia edition. It is the only internet resource of its kind in Welsh and has an average of 2.7 million hits every month, making it the most popular Welsh language website. It, therefore, has an important place in Welsh language online culture.

It has been referred to in the Welsh-language current affairs magazine Golwg and Y Faner Newydd, and is listed by the National Library of Wales as a Welsh-language e-resource.

In an August 2007 interview, Jimmy Wales, co-founder of Wikipedia, used the Welsh Wikipedia as an example of the rationale for having Wikipedias in smaller languages:

A direct link to the Welsh Wikipedia has been added to the Getting Started page of the Welsh-language version of the Mozilla Firefox web browser where it appears as the first of four recommended websites, above the National Library of Wales.

In September 2012 "Wici Cymru" was formed; this is a society whose aim is to develop Wikipedia in Wales. By October, BAFTA-winning actor Rhys Ifans had become its Patron.

In 2019, the Welsh Wikipedia was cited as one of the reasons for improvements in the handling of Welsh in Google Translate, by providing a large corpus of machine-readable Welsh text.

See also 
Encyclopaedia Cambrensis
Encyclopaedia of Wales
 Breton Wikipedia

References

External links 

 Statistics for Welsh Wikipedia by Erik Zachte
Wici Cymru

Welsh-language encyclopedias
Wikipedias by language
Internet properties established in 2003
Welsh-language mass media
Wikipedias in Celtic languages